Time-Line the eleventh studio album by the English progressive rock band Renaissance, released in April 1983. It was the last album released by Renaissance before they disbanded in 1987.

With this album, Renaissance departed from their signature sound and toward 1980s pop, a change which had begun on their previous album, Camera Camera. It was a commercial failure and received the worst reviews of the band's career. It was followed by a band hiatus of nearly 20 years.

While Camera Camera'''s sound was influenced by the band members who had played as Nevada (Annie Haslam and Michael Dunford, along with keyboardist Peter Gosling), on Time-Line Jon Camp took charge of the musical tone and direction. He wrote all the lyrics, strongly influenced the musical style, and went so far as to call this the band's "best album."

Reception

In a retrospective review, Allmusic called Time-Line "the same kind of new wave-prog hybrid as Camera Camera'', with anachronistic -- but irresistible -- little numbers like 'Richard the IX'" and "An enjoyably peppy record."

Track listing

Personnel

Renaissance
Annie Haslam - lead and backing vocals
Jon Camp - bass, backing, co-lead and lead vocals, guitars
Michael Dunford - guitars, backing vocals

Additional musicians
Peter Gosling, Nick Magnus, Eddie Hardin - keyboards
Peter Barron, Ian Mosley - drums
Bimbo Acock - saxophone
Dave Thomson - trumpet

Production
John Acock - engineer
Kevin Metcalfe - mastering at Utopia Studios, London

References

1983 albums
Renaissance (band) albums
Illegal Records albums
I.R.S. Records albums